Janota is a surname. In the Czech Republic and Poland, it comes from the personal name Jan ("John") and the suffix -ota. In Portuguese, it means "elegant". The surname may refer to:
 Eduard Janota (1952-2011), Czech economist
 Elisabeth von Janota-Bzowski (1912–2012), German artist
 Jolanta Janota (born 1964), Polish athlete
 Michał Janota (born 1990), Polish footballer
 Miroslav Janota (born 1948), Czech wrestler
 Ricardo Janota (born 1987), Portuguese footballer

References

See also
 

Czech-language surnames
Polish-language surnames
Patronymic surnames